Zdislava Rosalina Augusta Braunerová, called Zdenka (9 April 1858, Prague - 23 May 1934, Prague) was a Czech landscape painter, illustrator and graphic artist, whose work was influenced by her connection to Paris. She was the first female member of the Mánes Union of Fine Arts, and a patron of numerous other Czech artists.

Biography 
She was born into a wealthy family. She developed her interest in art from her mother, Augusta, who was an amateur painter. Prominent writers and artists were regular guests at her home. As her talents became apparent, she began taking lessons from Amalie Mánesová. Later, she studied with Soběslav Pinkas.

All of this was in addition to her regular education, and her parents were taken by surprise when she informed them that she had decided to pursue painting as a profession, but they could not dissuade her. In part, this decision may have been prompted by her meeting with Antonín Chittussi, a young painter with whom she would develop a long friendship, verging on a romance. The relationship cooled, however, toward the end of Chittussi's life, as did one with Julius Zeyer, who was seventeen years her senior. Later, a planned marriage to Vilém Mrštík was called off at the last minute.

The influence of Paris
A major inspiration for her art was Paris, where she spent part of each year from 1881 to 1893, and the painters of the Barbizon school. Her future brother-in-law, Élémir Bourges, served as her guide and introduced her to many literary figures such as Maurice Maeterlinck and Anatole France. While there, she also attended the Académie Colarossi and exhibited frequently; in Paris at the Salon and in Prague at the Rudolfinum. However, through all of these years, she never abandoned her connections to her homeland, often taking part in performances where she would dance in Czech costumes and sing folk songs. She had, in fact considered becoming a singer before turning to art. In 1896, she became the first female member of the Mánes Union of Fine Arts, but was apparently expelled in 1906.

Later, she opened a studio in Roztoky and, in 1902, she extended an invitation to Auguste Rodin to visit Bohemia and Moravia. In 1909, she developed a close friendship with Paul Claudel, who was serving as the French consul in Prague. She also had one last affair, probably platonic, with the writer . He was twenty-five years younger and her family was scandalized, but he died in 1917 from wounds suffered in World War I. Roztoky would be her home for the rest of her life, and she would draw inspiration from the rural people and landscapes, while keeping a detailed diary and series of sketchbooks. She continued to exhibit until 1932 and died while staying at her family's home in Prague.

In addition to her painting, she was also a printmaker, book designer and glass engraver. For many years, she was involved in efforts to help prevent the destruction of the Staré Město (the Medieval section of Prague) and Josefov (the old Jewish ghetto). As part of this effort, she created a series of prints depicting the area. Many younger artists, such as František Bílek, Jan Zrzavý and Joža Uprka, received financial support from her.

Selected paintings

References

Further reading
 Miloslav Vlk, Zdenka Braunerová (1858 – 1934), Středočeské muzeum, 2004 
 František Kožík, The Life Story of Painter Zdenka Braunerová and the People Around Her, a two-part biographical novel: 
Na křídle větrného mlýna (On the Wing of the Windmill), Edice Klíč, 1989 
 Neklidné babí léto (Restless Gossamer), Edice Klíč, 1990 
 Milena Lenderová, Zdenka Braunerová, Mladá fronta, Prague 2000 
 Prokop H. Toman, Zdenka Braunerová - Popisný seznam grafického díla (A descriptive list of graphic works), Státní nakladatelství krásné literatury an umění, Prague, 1963

External links 

 More paintings and drawings by Braunerová and Photographs @ Výtvarné Umĕlkynĕ
 "Les traces de Zdenka Braunerova, artiste Tchèque, dans la culture Française" by Brigitte Brauner @ Régie Théâtrale 
 "Zdence Braunerové ke 150. výročí narození" (150th anniversary of her birth) by Marcela Šášinková @ Knihovna 
 "Galerie ženských osobností - Zdenka Braunerová" a program from Czech Radio

1858 births
1934 deaths
Artists from Prague
Czech women painters
Czech graphic designers
Landscape painters
19th-century Czech painters
20th-century Czech painters
19th-century women artists
20th-century Czech women artists
Académie Colarossi alumni
Women graphic designers